Cost of living is an economic concept.

Cost of living may also refer to:

Books
 The Cost of Living (book), a 1999 book by Arundhati Roy
 Cost of Living (play), a 2016 play by Martyna Majok

Film, television and radio
 The Cost of Living (2004 film), a film by DV8
 The Cost of Living (2003 film), a French film

TV
 "Cost of Living" (Star Trek: The Next Generation), a 1992 episode of Star Trek: The Next Generation
 "The Cost of Living" (Lost), a 2006 episode of Lost
 "The Cost of Living" (CSI: NY episode)

Radio
 The Cost of Living (radio show), a business/economics news radio show on the CBC Radio One network beginning in 2019.

Music 
 The Cost of Living, a 1980s band that included Matthew Caws and Daniel Lorca, who would later form Nada Surf

Albums
 The Cost of Living (EP), a 1979 EP by the Clash
 Cost of Living (Downtown Boys album) (2017)
 The Cost of Living (The Static Age album)
 Cost of Living (Rick Wakeman album) (1983)
 The Cost of Living (Jason Webley album) (2007)
 Cost of Living, a 2005 album by Delbert McClinton

Songs
 "Cost of Livin'", a 2011 song by Ronnie Dunn
"The Cost of Living", a 1966 song by The Downliners Sect

See also
 ACCRA Cost of Living Index, a measure of cost of living differences among urban areas in the United States, published quarterly
 Cost-of-living index, an economic measure of the change in cost of living